MBK Partners (MBKP) is a North Asian focused private equity firm. According to Forbes, MBK Partners is one of the largest private equity firms in Asia, managing $25 billion worth of assets.

Overview 
MBK Partners was founded in 2005 by Michael ByungJu Kim and several other senior Asian executives from the Carlyle Group. 

In 2021, the firm returned 

In January 2022, a 13% stake of the firm was sold to Dyal Capital Partners.

The firm has two main businesses, Buyouts and Special Situations. MBK Partners' investment focus is in North Asian regions, namely China, Japan and South Korea.

MBK Partners has offices in Beijing, Hong Kong, Seoul, Shanghai and Tokyo.

Funds

Notable investments  
 Godiva Japan
 HKBN
 Homeplus
 ING Life Korea
 K Bank
 Universal Studios Japan
 Wharf T&T

Notable transactions 

In May 2009, MBKP and Goldman Sachs acquired a 98.3% stake in Universal Studios Japan for 1.4 billion.

In August 2013, MBKP acquired ING's South Korean insurance unit for total cash proceeds of 1.84 trillion won ($1.65 billion).

In November 2014, MBKP sold accounting software maker, Yayoi Co to Japanese financial services provider, Orix Corp for 80 billion yen ($691 million).

In September 2015, Tesco sold its South Korean business, Homeplus, to MBKP, CPPIB and Temasek Holdings for £4 billion.

In October 2016, MBKP and TPG Capital acquired Wharf T&T from The Wharf (Holdings) for HK$9.5 billion ($1.2 billion). In August 2018, Wharf T&T was sold to Hong Kong's telecom operator HKBN for HK$10.5 billion ($1.34 billion).

In February 2019, MBKP acquired Godiva Chocolatier's Asian-Pacific operations for $1.5 billion.

References

External links 
 

Alternative investment management companies
Private equity firms of Asia-Pacific
Financial services companies established in 2005
South Korean companies established in 2005
Companies based in Seoul
Investment management companies of South Korea